James Dennis may refer to:
 James Dennis, 1st Baron Tracton (1721–1782), lord chief baron of the Exchequer in Ireland
 James Dennis (athlete) (born 1976), American discus thrower
 James Blatch Piggott Dennis (1815–1861), British paleontologist
 James L. Dennis (born 1936), American judge
 James U. Dennis (1823–1900), American politician and lawyer

See also
James Dennis House, historic building in Rhode Island, United States